Barbara Pepper (born Marion Pepper; May 31, 1915 – July 18, 1969) was an American stage, television, radio, and film actress. She is best known as the first Doris Ziffel on the sitcom Green Acres.

Early life and career
Marion Pepper was born in New York City, the daughter of actor David Mitchell "Dave" Pepper, and his wife, Harrietta S. Pepper. At age 16 she started life in show business with Goldwyn Girls, a musical stock company where she met Lucille Ball, with whom she would remain friends, during production of Eddie Cantor's Roman Scandals in 1933.

From 1937 to 1943, Pepper was a prolific actress, appearing in 43 movies, mostly in supporting roles or in minor films, with  exceptions being main characters in The Rogues' Tavern and Mummy's Boys, both feature films released in 1936. Among her later film parts were small roles in It's a Mad, Mad, Mad, Mad World (1963) and My Fair Lady (1964). She also performed radio parts. 

In 1943, she married actor Craig Reynolds (né Harold Hugh Enfield), and the couple later had two sons. After Reynolds died in 1949 in a California motorcycle accident, Pepper was left to raise their children alone. She never remarried.

After gaining weight, her roles were mostly confined to small character parts on television, including several appearances on I Love Lucy, The George Burns and Gracie Allen Show, Petticoat Junction, and The Jack Benny Program. She made four appearances on Perry Mason, including the role of Martha Dale, mother of the title character, in the 1957 episode "The Case of the Vagabond Vixen". In 1957, she guest-starred in the episode "The Diet" of the CBS situation comedy Mr. Adams and Eve, credited as "Fat Woman." In 1958, she appeared as "Boxcar Annie" on the television western Tales of Wells Fargo in the episode titled "Butch Cassidy".

A long-time friend of Lucille Ball, Pepper was first considered for the role of Ethel Mertz on I Love Lucy, but was passed over, purportedly due to the fact that she had a drinking problem. William Frawley ("Fred Mertz") did, likewise, and had already been cast. It was felt that having two drinkers in the cast might eventually cause difficulties so another actress was sought.

Pepper may be best remembered as the first Doris Ziffel on Petticoat Junction in 1964, although her character's name on the "Genghis Keane" episode of Petticoat Junction was Ruth Ziffel. Her role as Doris Ziffel continued on Green Acres from 1965 to 1968, until health ailments finally forced her to leave that weekly series. Actress Fran Ryan replaced her on Green Acres, which would continue to run for another three years. Pepper's final performance was in Hook, Line & Sinker (1969), in which she played Jerry Lewis's secretary.

Death
Barbara Pepper died of a coronary thrombosis at age 54 on July 18, 1969, in Panorama City, California.  She is buried at Hollywood Forever Cemetery in Los Angeles.

Selected filmography
 

Roman Scandals (1933) - Goldwyn Girl (uncredited)
Moulin Rouge (1934) - Show Girl (uncredited)
Bottoms Up (1934) - Chorine (uncredited)
Strictly Dynamite (1934) - Performer (uncredited)
Our Daily Bread (1934) - Sally
Kid Millions (1934) - Goldwyn Girl (uncredited)
Let 'Em Have It (1935) - Milly
Dante's Inferno (1935) - Drunk at Ship's Cafe (uncredited)
Anna Karenina (1935) - Party Girl (uncredited)
Waterfront Lady (1935) - Gloria Vance
The Sagebrush Troubadour (1935) - Joan Martin
Forced Landing (1935) - Nancy 'Dusty' Rhodes
Frisco Waterfront (1935) - The Blonde Stranger
The Fighting Coward (1935) - Marie's Friend (uncredited)
The Singing Vagabond (1935) - Honey
Taming the Wild (1936) - Hazel White
Show Boat (1936) - New Year's Eve Cutie (uncredited)
The Rogues Tavern (1936) - Marjorie Burns
M'Liss (1936) - Clytie Morpher
Mummy's Boys (1936) - Mary Browning
The Big Game (1936 film) - Lois - the Drunk's Girl (uncredited)
Wanted! Jane Turner (1936) - Marge Sanders - Posing as Jane Turner
Winterset (1936) - Girl
What Becomes of the Children? (1936) - Elsie Ford
Sea Devils (1937) - Spanked Blonde (uncredited)
Too Many Wives (1937) - Angela Brown
The Outcasts of Poker Flat (1937) - Blonde Saloon Floozie
You Can't Buy Luck (1937) - Store Clerk
You Can't Beat Love (1937) - May 'Bubbles' Smith
The Big Shot (1937) - Mamie
Forty Naughty Girls (1937) - Alice
Music for Madame (1937) - Blonde on Bus (uncredited)
The Westland Case (1937) - Agatha Hogan
Portia on Trial (1937) - Evelyn
Hollywood Stadium Mystery (1938) - Althea Ames
Wide Open Faces (1938) - Belle
The Lady in the Morgue (1938) - Kay Renshaw
The Chaser (1938) - Mabel the Drunken Girl (uncredited)
Army Girl (1938) - Riki Thomas
 The Strange Case of Dr. Meade (1938) - Mattie
Sweethearts (1938) - Telephone Operator (uncredited)
The Girl Downstairs (1938) - Woman at the Bar (uncredited)
They Made Me a Criminal (1939) - Budgie
Off the Record (1939) - Flossie - Telephone Operator (uncredited)
Bachelor Mother (1939) - Dance-Hall Hostess (uncredited)
The Magnificent Fraud (1939) - June (uncredited)
Colorado Sunset (1939) - Ginger Bixby
Flight at Midnight (1939) - Mildred
The Women (1939) - Tough Girl (uncredited)
Three Sons (1939) - Viola
 Scandal Sheet (1939) - Rena
The Amazing Mr. Williams (1939) - Muriel - Wedding Guest (uncredited)
Of Mice and Men (1939) - Second Girl (uncredited)
Castle on the Hudson (1940) - Goldie
Framed (1940) - Goldie Green
Forgotten Girls (1940) - Eve Abbott
Women in War (1940) - Millie, Irish Nurse
Sailor's Lady (1940) - Maude
The Return of Frank James (1940) - Nellie Blane
Foreign Correspondent (1940) - Dorine
Ride, Kelly, Ride (1941) - Trudy (uncredited)
The Cowboy and the Blonde (1941) - Chorine in Dressing Room (uncredited)
Out of the Fog (1941) - Cuban Room Cigarette Girl (uncredited)
Three Sons o' Guns (1941) - Francie
Manpower (1941) - Polly
We Go Fast (1941) - Southern Belle with Traffic Fine (uncredited)
Man at Large (1941) - Myrtle, Hotel Guest
South of Tahiti (1941) - Julie (uncredited)
Birth of the Blues (1941) - Maizie
My Favorite Spy (1942) - Speedy (uncredited)
One Thrilling Night (1942) - Lettie
Star Spangled Rhythm (1942) - Blonde Who Bruises Too Easy (uncredited)
Girls in Chains (1943) - Ruth
Let's Face It (1943) - Daisy (uncredited)
So This Is Washington (1943) - Betty - Taxi Driver (uncredited)
Cover Girl (1944) - Chorus Girl (uncredited)
Henry Aldrich Plays Cupid (1944) - Wild Rose (uncredited)
Once Upon a Time (1944) - Taxi Girl (uncredited)
Since You Went Away (1944) - Bowling Alley Pin Girl (uncredited)
I Love a Soldier (1944) - Blonde (uncredited)
An American Romance (1944) - Streetwalker (uncredited)
Can't Help Singing (1944) - Saloon Girl (uncredited)
Brewster's Millions (1945) - Cab Driver (uncredited)
Trouble Chasers (1945) - Goldie
The Naughty Nineties (1945) - Gilded Cage Hostess (uncredited)
Murder, He Says (1945) - Bonnie Fleagle
The Strange Affair of Uncle Harry (1945) -  Annie (uncredited)
Prison Ship (1945) - Winnie De Voe (uncredited)
The Hoodlum Saint (1946) - Dance Contestant #1 (uncredited)
 Terror Trail (1946) - Karen Kemp, the Louisville Lady
The Millerson Case (1947) - Eadie Rookstool (uncredited)
The Snake Pit (1948) - Patient (uncredited)
The Crooked Way (1949) - Shooting Gallery Proprietress (uncredited)
The Inspector General (1949) - Buxom Villager (uncredited)
Unmasked (1950) - Mrs. Schmidt
No Way Out (1950) - Woman (uncredited)
The Fuller Brush Girl (1950) - Wife Watching TV (uncredited)
My Blue Heaven (1950) - Susan (uncredited)
Thunderbirds (1952) - Mrs. Louise Braggart
So This Is Love (1953) - Fat Girl with Sailor in Nightclub (uncredited)
Inferno (1953) - Waitress (uncredited)
The Eddie Cantor Story (1953) - Patron (uncredited)
A Star Is Born (1954) - Esther's Neighbor (uncredited)
Young at Heart (1954) - Wife (uncredited)
The D.I. (1957) - Woman Customer
Rock-A-Bye Baby (1958) - Mrs. Oberholt (uncredited)
Auntie Mame (1958) - Mrs. Krantz (uncredited)
The Bramble Bush (1960) - Polly Welk (uncredited)
Sex Kittens Go to College (1960) - Circe - Big Woman with Ripped Dress (uncredited)
The Music Man (1962) - Feril Hawkes - Snapping Beans (uncredited)
It's Only Money (1962) - Fisherwoman
A Child Is Waiting (1963) - Miss Brown (uncredited)
It's a Mad, Mad, Mad, Mad World (1963) - Woman on Phone at Garage (uncredited)
Who's Minding the Store? (1963) - Customer at Bargain Sale (uncredited)
The Patsy (1964) - Bowler (uncredited)
My Fair Lady (1964) - Doolittle's Dance Partner (uncredited)
Kiss Me, Stupid (1964) - Big Bertha
Hook, Line & Sinker (1969) - Peter's Secretary (uncredited) (final film role)

References

External links

1915 births
1969 deaths
Actresses from New York City
American film actresses
American radio actresses
American stage actresses
American television actresses
Burials at Hollywood Forever Cemetery
Deaths from coronary thrombosis
20th-century American actresses